The Grob G103 is a family of glass-reinforced plastic two-seat sailplanes developed in Germany by Grob Aircraft AG. The aircraft are of T-tail configuration and fitted with upper surface air brakes. They are designed for training, high performance soaring and basic aerobatic flying (Twin II Acro and Twin III Acro).

 Grob G103 Twin Astir Built since 1976, with retractable or fixed undercarriage in front of the center of gravity and water ballast.
 Grob G103a Twin II a new and unrelated design that replaced the Twin Astir from 1980, with fixed undercarriage behind the center of gravity and nose wheel.
 Grob G103c Twin III Replaced the Twin II from 1989, with a new triple-trapezoidal wing, lower control forces and higher airspeed limitations.